ARAG may refer to:

 Arag, a town in Sangli district in the Indian state of Maharashtra
 Advanced Research and Assessment Group
 ARAG SE European Insurance Group
 ARAG-Tower Düsseldorf 
 ARAG ATP World Team Championship